Victor Andrag (born 29 March 1976), is a Malaysian former footballer, chiefly associated with Kedah and a former captain of the team. He played as a centre back. During his career at Kedah, Victor has won every honour the club are eligible for with the exception of the AFC Cup. His present position as assistant coach of Malaysia Super League club Kedah Darul Aman.

Early life
Victor was raised in Bedong, a small town in Kedah and located 12 km to the north of Sungai Petani, to Andrag Narimuthu and Anamah Joseph. He was a 400 metres track athlete during his school years at the Sultan Abdul Hamid College, Alor Star. He started his football career with Kedah Ansell FC, a club based in Kulim.

Club career
One of the longest-serving players and highly experienced of the team starting from 2002, Victor was given the captain's armband after the departure of Akmal Rizal Ahmad Rakhli and Mohd Fauzi Nan. He was at the heart of the Kedah defence under Mohd Azraai Khor Abdullah though previous coach Jørgen Erik Larsen preferred to use him as a full-back. Victor's height and strength makes him a towering figure at the centre of the Kedah defence. He was a part of the squad that won historical double treble titles. 

After retiring from playing professionally, Victor worked as assistant coach at Penang FA in 2012, assisting head coach János Krecska. After Penang, he returned to Kedah FA as a youth coach. In 2019, Victor was appointed assistant coach to Aidil Sharin Sahak at Kedah FA. On 17 October 2022, after Aidil Sharin left his role as head coach, Victor was named interim coach before his position takeover by former Terengganu FC coach Nafuzi Zain in early December 2022 as head coach Kedah.

International career
For international stages he is also a part of Allan Harris team, Malaysia national football team during 2002 Tiger Cup. He only made two appearances in the tournament, against Laos and Vietnam.

Managerial statistics

Honours

Kedah 
 Malaysia Super League: 2006-07, 2007–08
 Malaysia Premier League: 2002, 2005–06
 Malaysia FA Cup: 2007, 2008
 Malaysia Cup: 2007, 2008

References

External links
 

1976 births
Living people
Malaysian footballers
Malaysia international footballers
Kedah Darul Aman F.C. players
People from Kedah
Malaysian people of Indian descent
Association football defenders